Lal Sena (1974–1990, English: Red Army) was an organised armed militia of CPIML Liberation in northeastern India, across the terrains of central Bihar, north-west of today's Jharkhand, and a few districts of eastern Uttar Pradesh. It was formed mainly by lower caste (middle and lower class) peasantry and landless labourers.

Background 
In 1960s, when the Naxalite movement started under the leadership of Communist Party of India (Marxist–Leninist), the poor peasantry and agricultural labourers who belonged mainly to the lower castes started taking side with the communists in central Bihar across the districts of Bhojpur, Gaya, Nalanda, Patna and Aurangabad. Several violent armed clashes occurred between the landlords and poor/landless peasantry. In 1970s, CPI (ML) faced hard offence from central and state governments throughout India and splintered into several ML factions. In 1974, one of the ML factions was able to hold on to the grounds and reorganised itself into the CPI(ML) Liberation political party. Meanwhile, the landlords/landowners most of whom economically were from upper class peasantry (mainly upper caste ) organised themselves based on caste lines into several landlord gentries. In retaliation Lal Sena guerrilla armed squads, were organised by then underground CPI (ML) Liberation.

After 2005 
Since the late 2000s, Lal Sena's squad activity has been curtailed. The CPI (ML) Liberation party's movements took a militant but democratic approach through legalised workers, peasants, students, youth and women organisations, as noted by Dr. Sanjay K. Jha:

See also 
 Ranvir Sena
 Kuer Sena
 List of communist parties in India

References

Communist organisations in India
Communist Party of India (Marxist–Leninist) Liberation
Defunct communist militant groups
Land rights movements
Left-wing militant groups in India
Politics of Bihar